South Slope, originally South Park Slope, is a neighborhood in Brooklyn, New York City, between Sunset Park/Greenwood Heights to the south and Park Slope to the north. Because there are no official borders to neighborhoods in New York City, definitions of the boundaries of South Slope can differ significantly. Real estate listings in The New York Times, for instance, use 9th Street as the northern border, the Prospect Expressway as the southern border, with Fourth Avenue the boundary of the west and Prospect Park West and 8th Avenue to the east. Other definitions use 15th Street on the north and 24th Street to the south.

While the name "South Slope" has been used for many years, the area was officially designated "South Park Slope" when it was rezoned by the New York City Department of City Planning in 2005. It is primarily made up of pre-war row houses, although there has been a spate of new, non-contextual construction in recent years predominantly in the inner blocks with higher density development along 4th Avenue due to the 2005 R8A zoning designation.

South Slope is a part of Brooklyn Community District 7 along with Greenwood Heights, Windsor Terrace and Sunset Park.

LGBT community 
One of the areas with a significant gay population in NYC, it hosts the famous Lesbian Herstory Archives that contain the world's largest collection of materials by and about lesbians. Also, South slope hosts several events of the Brooklyn pride such as (i) the MultiCultural Festival and (ii) the final stop of the Twilight Parade. Furthermore, South Slope is home of several LGBTQI+ bars, restaurants and shops such as Good Judy, Xstasy Bar and Lounge, Young Ethel's and Commonwealth.

References

External links

South Slope News

LGBT culture in New York City
Neighborhoods in Brooklyn
Park Slope